Baron de Lestac is a Bordeaux wine brand owned by Groupe Castel. Baron de Lestac is produced as a red wine (a blend of Cabernet Sauvignon and Merlot) and a white wine (a blend of Sauvignon and Sémillon), both Bordeaux AOC wines and produced with an influence of oak. The wine is sold in a variety of containers including bottles and bag-in-box.

A Haut-Médoc AOC wine is also produced, under the name Les Hauts de Lestac, and is marketed as a high-end version of Baron de Lestac.

In 2007, at 750,000 cases (9 million bottles), Baron de Lestac was the third most selling Bordeaux brand behind Mouton Cadet and Castel's Malesan, and the fastest-growing.

References

External links
 Official site 

Bordeaux wine
Wine brands
French brands